Preußen was a fishing trawler requisitioned during World War II by the Kriegsmarine for use as a Vorpostenboot. She was built in 1930 as August Wriedt, and was renamed Preußen in 1933. On 13 August 1944, she was sunk off Langeoog by Bristol Beaufighter aircraft of 254 Squadron, Royal Air Force.

Description
She was powered by a triple expansion steam engine driving a single screw propeller via a low pressure turbine, double reduction gearing and a hydraulic coupling. The engine, rated at 93nhp, was built by the Deutsche Schiff- und Maschinenbau, AG Weser, Bremen.

History
August Wriedt was built as yard number 552 in 1930 by Schiffswerft J. Frerichs & Co, Einswarden as a fishing trawler for the Nordsee Deutsche Hochseefischerei. She was completed in July 1930. Her port of registry was Nordenham and the Code Letters RHQP were allocated. By 1933, she had been renamed Preußen, and her port of registry was Cuxhaven. Her engine was then rated at 115 nhp. In 1934, her Code Letters were changed to DHBR.

In September 1939, Preußen was requisitioned by the Kriegsmarine, initially serving in the Baltic Sea as Vorpostenboot V 1101 Preußen with 11 Vorpostenflotille, which was under the command of Kapitänleutnant der Reserve Günther Reisen. From January 1940, she served in the North Sea. On 5 June 1940, the cargo ship  struck a mine off Stavanger, Norway and was beached. V 1101 Preußen was one of five vessels that assisted in the salvage of her cargo.

References

1930 ships
Ships built in Germany
Fishing vessels of Germany
World War II auxiliary ships of Germany
Maritime incidents in August 1944
Ships sunk by British aircraft
World War II shipwrecks in the North Sea